Jill Larson (born October 7, 1947) is an American actress. She is best known for her role as Opal Cortlandt on the ABC daytime soap opera, All My Children (1989-2011), and as titular character in the 2014 supernatural horror film The Taking of Deborah Logan.

Early life
Larson was born in Minneapolis, Minnesota, the daughter of Ruth Evangeline (née Boyce), an interior decorator, and John Charles Larson, an aerospace engineer. She has three sisters. Larson attended the same high school as Dorothy Lyman, who played Opal on All My Children before her. She enrolled at the University of Minnesota (eventually, she finished her education at Hunter College), and began singing in nightclubs with a group called Just Us. It was not long before Just Us was discovered and headed to New York City, where they recorded several soundtracks, including the one for the film, Rachel, Rachel, starring Joanne Woodward.

Career
Larson and her sister traveled throughout Europe in a bus, before she settled in Paris, France.  She became a model, and was soon appearing in major American and European fashion spreads. While in Paris, she also landed her first film role (as a Swedish au pair) in Deadly Trap, starring Faye Dunaway and Frank Langella. Her next film role was as Jeanne Moreau's rival for her character's younger lover in the film, Dear Louise.

Larson made her Broadway debut in Death and the King's Horseman (1987). Other Broadway credits include Romantic Comedy by Bernard Slade and Dancing in the End Zone by Bill Davis. Her Off-Broadway credits include Mayo Simon's two-person play These Men (1980)  and Terrence McNally's It's Only a Play (1982). Other regional credits include Private Lives, Full Gallop (a one-woman show portraying the famous editor of Vogue, Diana Vreeland), Holiday, The Seagull, the title roles in Agnes of God and Gypsy. In addition to performing, Larson produced the cabaret revue Serious Bizness (1983). One of her proudest accomplishments was producing and appearing in Wicked & My So Called Life - a comedy revue written by Winnie Holzman and David Babcock, which ran successfully Off-Broadway for 8 months.

In 1986, Larson made her daytime television debut as TV columnist Judith Clayton on CBS's As the World Turns. In 1988, she briefly played bomb-loving psycho Ursula Blackwell on One Life to Live before landing the role of Opal on All My Children. She received two Daytime Emmy Award for Outstanding Supporting Actress in a Drama Series nominations for her performance. In June 2006, after approximately 17 years on contract at All My Children, Larson was taken off contract and reassigned to recurring status. But in early December 2009, ABC announced that, effective immediately, Larson would go back to contract status to ensure her stay with the show through its move to LA. She returned to All My Children on the short-lived revival web series in 2013. In 2014, Larson guest starred on The Young and the Restless.

In addition to her career on the daytime television, Larson appeared in a number of films, such as White Squall (1996), Were the World Mine (2008) and Shutter Island (2010), and guest starred on Law & Order: Criminal Intent, Desperate Housewives, and CSI: Crime Scene Investigation. In 2014 she had the leading role in the horror-thriller film, The Taking of Deborah Logan. Larson received positive reviews for her performance in film. She later co-starred in horror films Can't Take It Back (2017) and The Manor (2021).

Filmography

Film

Television

References

External links
Official site 

American soap opera actresses
American stage actresses
Actresses from Minnesota
1947 births
University of Minnesota alumni
Living people
Circle in the Square Theatre School alumni
American film actresses
American television actresses
20th-century American actresses
21st-century American actresses